Bisin is a naturally occurring lantibiotic (an antibacterial peptide) discovered by University of Minnesota microbiologist Dan O'Sullivan. Unlike earlier lantibiotics discovered, such as nisin, bisin also kills Gram-negative bacteria, including E. coli, Salmonella and Listeria.

The food-preservative properties of bisin could lead to food products that resist spoilage for years.

See also 

 Nisin - a related food preservative currently in use

References

External links 

 Bactericidal Lanbiotic Inhibits Gram-negative Bacteria. Office for Technology Commercialization, University of Minnesota. June 25, 2010.

Lantibiotics
Food preservation
Peptides
Bacteriocins